This is a list of compositions by Einojuhani Rautavaara. Rautavaara stopped using opus numbers for his new compositions during the 1970s. In addition, he revised several of his compositions many years after they were originally composed. Therefore, using opus numbers in connection with his works is not a necessity.

Operas
Kaivos (The Mine) (1957–1958/1960/1963)
Apollo contra Marsyas (1970)
The Myth of Sampo (1974/1982)
Thomas (1982–1985)
Vincent (1986–1987)
The House of the Sun (Auringon talo), chamber opera (1989–1990)
The Gift of the Magi (Tietäjien lahja), chamber opera (1993–1994)
Aleksis Kivi (1995–1996)
Rasputin (2001–2003)

Symphonies
Symphony No. 1 (1956/1988/2003)
Symphony No. 2 (1957/1984)
Symphony No. 3 (1961)
Symphony No. 4: Arabescata (1962)
Symphony No. 5 (1985–1986)
Symphony No. 6: Vincentiana (1992)
Symphony No. 7: Angel of Light (1994)
Symphony No. 8: The Journey (1999)

Concertos
 Cello Concerto No. 1 (1968)
 Piano Concerto No. 1 (1969)
Ballad, for harp and strings (1973/1981)
 Flute Concerto: Dances with the Winds (1975)
 Violin Concerto (1976–77)
 Organ Concerto: Annunciations (1976–77)
 Double Bass Concerto: Angel of Dusk (1980)
 Piano Concerto No. 2 (1989)
 Piano Concerto No. 3: Gift of Dreams (1998)
 Harp Concerto (2000)
 Clarinet Concerto (2001)
 Percussion Concerto: Incantations (2008)
 Cello Concerto No. 2: Towards the Horizon (2008–09)
Fantasia, for solo violin and orchestra (2015)
Deux Sérénades, for solo violin and orchestra (2016/18 completed by Kalevi Aho, premiered posthumously)

Choral orchestral
 Concerto for Soprano, Choir and Orchestra: Daughter of the Sea (Meren tytär) (1971)
 Children's Mass (Lapsimessu), for children's choir and orchestra (1973)
 On the Last Frontier, fantasy for chorus and orchestra (1997)
Balada, for solo tenor, mixed choir and orchestra (2014)

Other orchestral works
Modificata (1957/2003)
Anadyomene – Adoration of Aphrodite (1968)
Garden of Spaces (1972/2003)
Cantus Arcticus (1972)
Angels and Visitations (1978)
Isle of Bliss (1995)
Autumn Gardens (1999)
Book of Visions (2003–05)
Manhattan Trilogy (2004)
Before the Icons (2005)
A Tapestry of Life (2007)
In the Beginning (2015-2016)

String orchestra
The Fiddlers (Pelimannit) (1952/1972)
Suite for Strings (1952)
Divertimento (1953)
An Epitaph for Béla Bartók (1955/1986)
Canto I (1960)
Canto II (1961)
Canto III – A Portrait of the Artist at a Certain Moment (1972)
Ballade for harp and strings (1973/1981)
A Finnish Myth (1977)
Ostrobothnian Polska (1980)
Hommage à Kodály Zoltán (Bird Gardens) (1982)
Hommage à Liszt Ferenc (1989)
Canto IV (1992)
Adagio celeste (2000)
Canto V – Into the Heart of Light (2011)

Brass band
 A Requiem in Our Time (1953)
 A Military Mass (1968)
 Playgrounds for Angels (1981)

Chamber/instrumental
String Quartets:
String Quartet No. 1 (1952)
String Quartet No. 2 (1958)
String Quartet No. 3 (1965)
String Quartet No. 4 (1975)
Wind Octet (1962)
Sonetto, for clarinet and piano (1969)
Dithyrambos, for violin and piano (1970) (also in version for violin and orchestra)
Bassoon Sonata (1965/1968)
Cello Sonatas:
Cello Sonata No. 1 (1972–1973/2001)
Cello Sonata No. 2 (1991)
Variétude, for solo violin (1974)
Sonata for Flute and Guitar (1975)
Serenades of the Unicorn, for guitar (1977)
Monologues of the Unicorn, for guitar (1980)
Partita, for guitar (1956/1980 - incomplete 1956 version lost)
Notturno e Danza, for violin and piano (1993)
String Quintets:
String Quintet No. 1: Les cieux inconnus (1997)
String Quintet No. 2: Variations for Five (2013)
Hymnus, for trumpet and organ (1998)
Lost Landscapes, for violin and piano (2005)
April Lines, for violin and piano (2006)
The Last Runo, for flute and string quartet (2007)
Summer Thoughts, for violin and piano (2008)
Whispering, for violin and piano

Piano
Three Symmetrical Preludes (1949–50)
The Fiddlers (1952)
The Icons (1955)
Seven Preludes (1956)
Partita (1956–58)
Six Études (1969)
Sonata No. 1: Christus und die Fischer (1969)
Sonata No. 2: The Fire Sermon (1970)
Music for Upright Piano No. 1 (1976)
Music for Upright Piano No. 2 (1976)
Narcissus (2001)
Passionale (2003)
Fuoco (2007)
Mirroring (2014)

Organ
Ta tou theou, Op. 30 (1967)
Laudatio trinitatis (1969)
Toccata, Op. 59 (1971)

Choral
 Ludus verbalis, motet for declamatory choir (1960)
 Missa duodecanonica, mass (liturgy) in Latin, (1963)
 Praktisch Deutsch, motet for declamatory choir (1969)
 True & False Unicorn, cantata (1971/2000)
 All-Night Vigil (Vigilia), for chorus and soloists (1971–72/1996)
 Credo, for mixed chorus (1972)
 Book of Life (Elämän kirja), choral suite (1972)
 Lorca Suite, for mixed or children's choir (1973)
 The Bride (Morsian), choral song (1975)
 The Departure (Lähtö), choral song (1975)
 Summer Night (Sommarnatten), choral song (1975)
 Kainuu, cantata for chorus, reciter and percussion (1975)
 Canticum Mariae Virginis, for chorus a cappella (1978)
 Magnificat, for mixed chorus (1979)
 Nirvana Dharma, for chorus, soprano and flute (1979)
 The Cathedral (Katedralen), for chorus and soloists (1982)
 Legenda, for male choir (1985)
 Cancion de nuestro tiempo, choral suite (1993)
 Die erste Elegie, choral song (1993)
 With Joy We Go Dancing (Och glädjen den dansar), choral song (1993)
 Wenn sich die Welt auftut, for SSAA chorus (1996)
 In the Shade of the Willow (Halavan himmeän alla), choral song (1998)
 Our Joyful'st feast, for chorus (2008)
 Four Romances from the opera Rasputin, for male chorus
 Unsere Liebe, for mixed chorus (1996/2010)
 Missa a cappella, for mixed chorus (2010–11)
Hommage to an Old Composer, for male chorus (2014)

Vocal
 Three Sonnets of Shakespeare (1951/2005)
 Sacred Feasts (Pyhiä päiviä) (1953)
 Five Sonnets to Orpheus (1955–56/1960)
 Die Liebenden (1958–59/1964)
 God's Way (Guds väg) (1964/2003)
 The Trip (Matka) (1977)
 Dream World (Maailman uneen) (1972–82)
 In my Lover's Garden (I min älsklings trädgård) (1983–87)
 Three Songs from the Opera Aleksis Kivi (Kolme laulua oopperasta Aleksis Kivi) (1997)
 Rubáiyát (2014)

References
Fennica Gehrman home page (publisher)
List of works from Music Finland  
CV and list of works from the Finnish Music Information Centre

Rautavaara, Einojuhani